León de Greiff Library, also known as La Ladera Parque Biblioteca (English: Hillside Library Park), is an architecturally renowned library park in Medellín, Colombia. It is named after the poet Leon de Greiff and designed by architect Giancarlo Mazzanti.

History
León de Greiff Library stands on the site where a late 19th century monastery was transformed into La Ladera prison, which at one point housed over one thousand prisoners.

References

Buildings and structures in Medellín
Culture in Medellín
Libraries in Colombia
Libraries established in 2007
2007 establishments in Colombia